Sourav Chakraborty (born 27 June 1990, in Kolkata) is an Indian footballer who plays as a striker for Mohun Bagan in the I-League.

Career

Mohun Bagan
Sourav started his footballing career with Techno Aryan F.C. as a youth player before joining the Mohun Bagan Academy. He then signed for Mohun Bagan as a first team player over the summer of 2011 and made his debut during the 2011-12 I-League season.

Career statistics

Club
Statistics accurate as of 12 February 2012

References

Indian footballers
1990 births
Living people
Footballers from Kolkata
I-League players
Mohun Bagan AC players
Association football defenders
Peerless SC players